Demetris Kizas (born September 6, 1953) is a Cypriot former international footballer.

He began to play football from Paralimni in 1971 and in 1976 he went to Greece to play for Panathinaikos. After a big career with Panathinaikos, in 1981 he went to Panachaiki and the next year to the OFI of Crete. A year later, he returned to Panachaiki where he retired in 1989. Today he is a permanent resident of Patras. He is a member and has been also chairman of veterans of Panachaiki.

He wore the shirt of the Cyprus national football team nine times and scored one goal.

Honours

Panathinaikos 
 Greek Championship : 1977
 Greek Cup : 1977

Panachaiki 
 Champion in Beta Ethniki : 1984 και 1987

Enosis Neon Paralimni 
 Runner-up of Cypriot Cup : 1974 και 1975

Cyprus national football team

External links 
 
 

1954 births
Living people
Cypriot footballers
Cyprus international footballers
Enosis Neon Paralimni FC players
Panachaiki F.C. players
OFI Crete F.C. players
Panathinaikos F.C. players
Association football defenders
People from Paralimni